The U.S. Post Office—Waltham Main is a historic post office building in Waltham, Massachusetts.  The T-shaped brick and stone building was built in 1935, as part of a Works Progress Administration project during the Great Depression.  The Classical Revival building was designed by the Boston firm of Wadsworth, Hubbard & Smith.  The interior is of a layout typical of other period post offices, with a central lobby area flanked by the postmaster's office on the left and a work area on the right.  This public area is faced in a variety of stone products, predominantly marble from a variety of sources.

The building was listed on the National Register of Historic Places in 1986.

See also 

National Register of Historic Places listings in Waltham, Massachusetts
List of United States post offices

References 

Waltham
Government buildings completed in 1935
Buildings and structures in Waltham, Massachusetts
National Register of Historic Places in Waltham, Massachusetts